This is a list of notable American photojournalists. For photojournalists of other nationalities, see list of photojournalists.

A

B

C

D

E

F

G

H

I

J

K

L

M

N

O

P

Q

R

S

T

U

V

W

X

Y

Z

See also

 List of photojournalists (Dynamic list by country of origin)
 Lists of journalists
 List of photographers
 National Press Photographers Association

References 

American photojournalists
Articles containing video clips
Mass media in the United States
Lists of American people by occupation